Total Death is the sixth studio album by Norwegian black metal band Darkthrone. It was recorded in August and October 1995 at Ancient Specter Ruins and released in 1996 by Moonfog Productions.

All of the album's lyrics were written either by members of other black metal bands or Nocturno Culto (unlike the band's usual method on other Darkthrone albums, in which Fenriz was the main lyricist).

The album was released on CD and LP; the vinyl edition featured different cover art. In March 2011, Total Death was reissued by Peaceville Records with an extra track and an extra CD of commentary by the band members. The extra track was recorded around the same time as the album and previously appeared on a Moonfog compilation.

Track listing
Lyrics by Nocturno Culto unless noted otherwise.

Credits
Fenriz – drums, electric guitar and  bass guitar on tracks 1, 4, 6 and 8
Nocturno Culto – vocals, electric guitar and bass guitar on tracks 2, 3, 5 and 7

References

Darkthrone albums
1996 albums